HMS Eclipse was an E-class destroyer of the Royal Navy that saw service in the Atlantic, Arctic, and Mediterranean theatres during World War II, until sunk by a mine in the Aegean Sea on 24 October 1943.

Description
The E-class ships were slightly improved versions of the preceding D class. They were powered by two Parsons geared steam turbines, each driving one propeller shaft, using steam provided by three Admiralty three-drum boilers. The ships' complement was 145 officers and ratings.

The ships mounted four 45-calibre 4.7-inch (120 mm) Mark IX guns in single mounts. For anti-aircraft (AA) defence, they had two quadruple Mark I mounts for the 0.5 inch Vickers Mark III machine gun. The E class was fitted with two above-water quadruple torpedo tube mounts for  torpedoes. One depth charge rail and two throwers were fitted; 20 depth charges were originally carried, but this increased to 35 shortly after the war began.

Construction and career
Eclipse, the eighth ship of that name to serve with the Royal Navy, was ordered 1 November 1932, from Denny under the 1931 Naval Programme. She was laid down on 22 March 1933 at their Dumbarton dockyard, and launched on 12 April 1934. The ship was commissioned on 29 November 1934, at a total cost of £246, 664, excluding government-furnished equipment like the armament.

Assigned to the 5th Destroyer Flotilla of the Home Fleet with her sister ships, Eclipse served around the British Isles for the next several months, departing Plymouth on 31 August 1935 for the Mediterranean Fleet with most of the rest of the flotilla during the Abyssinia Crisis. The destroyer was based at Haifa from 8 September to 3 October, Alexandria from 4 October to 5 January 1936, and at several bases in the Eastern Mediterranean until her departure from the region in March. She was refitted from 20 March to 30 April at Devonport after returning to the British Isles.

Operation Menace

In autumn 1940, Eclipse was deployed as part of the protective screen for troopships sailing to West Africa in Operation Menace (for proposed landings at Dakar, later abandoned). She returned home to join the 3rd Destroyer Flotilla after repairs – first at Freetown, Sierra Leone, and subsequently at Gibraltar. In this period, one member of her crew was Charles Causley, the Cornish poet and broadcaster, who served as a Coder. He subsequently published two poems about the ship and this voyage: 'HMS Eclipse Approaches Freetown'; and 'Immunity', which recounts an inoculation session, and then anticipates the ship's loss later in the war.

From 12 April 1941 Eclipse was refitted at Devonport Dockyard, sailing in early June to rejoin the 3rd Destroyer Flotilla. On 25 June she was deployed to protect the ships of the 1st Minelaying Squadron during a minelay in the Northern Barrage, replacing the destroyer , which had been damaged in a collision with the cruiser .

Operation Gauntlet
Canadian troops landed to destroy mining equipment and two radio stations, while Norwegian and Russian civilians were evacuated.

Operation Gearbox
Eclipse remained on screening duty from June to August, transferring to the 8th Destroyer Flotilla in July.

She then refitted at a shipyard on the Humber before rejoining the Flotilla at Scapa Flow on 20 November.

Convoy HX 231

In April 1043 Eclipse was one of the escorts of Convoy HX 231, which was attacked by 11 U-boats from four flotillas. Eclipse rescued 16 survivors from the Dutch cargo ship  on 9 April, and landed them at Reykjavík the next day.

Sinking of Gaetano Donizetti
The Italian  of 3,428 tons, had been seized by the Germans to bring arms to Rhodes. The Germans stowed some 1,600 prisoners in the cargo hold. Gaetano Donizetti set sail on 22 September 1943 . The vessel sailed along the east coast of Rhodes, and headed south-west, passing Lindos to the south. The Italian ship was escorted by the German torpedo boat  under Oberleutnant Jobst Hahndorff. This was the former French torpedo boat La Pomone and later the Italian FR 42.

Around 01:10 that night (on 23 September), the convoy was detected by Eclipse under Commander E. Mack, who immediately opened fire. Gaetano Donizetti sank in seconds, taking with her the entire crew and all the Italian prisoners of war and German guards and crew. TA10 was heavily damaged and later towed back to Rhodes, where it was scuttled a few days later.

Loss
On 24 October 1943 Eclipse hit a mine east off Kalymnos in position . She broke in two and sank within five minutes with the loss of 119 of the ship's company and 134 soldiers (from A Company, 4th Battalion, Buffs (Royal East Kent Regiment)).

References

Bibliography

External links
 HMS Eclipse – A Survivors Story

 

E and F-class destroyers of the Royal Navy
Ships built on the River Clyde
1934 ships
World War II destroyers of the United Kingdom
World War II shipwrecks in the Aegean Sea
Maritime incidents in October 1943
Ships sunk by mines